Breconshire or Brecknockshire was a constituency in Wales which returned one Member of Parliament (MP)  to the House of Commons of the English Parliament, and later to the Parliament of Great Britain and of the United Kingdom, between 1542 and 1918. (Historically, the "-shire" suffix was often omitted, leading to potential confusion with the Brecon borough constituency, which existed until 1885.)

History 
Like the rest of Wales, Breconshire was given the right to representation by the Laws in Wales Acts 1535 and 1542, and first returned an MP to the Parliament of 1542. The constituency consisted of the historic county of Brecknockshire. (Although the county town, Brecon, was a borough which elected an MP in its own right, it was not excluded from the county constituency, and owning property within the borough could confer a vote at the county election.) The county elected one MP, who was chosen by the first past the post electoral system — when there was a contest at all, which was rare.

As in other county constituencies, the franchise until 1832 was defined by the Forty Shilling Freeholder Act, which gave the right to vote to every man who possessed freehold property within the county valued at £2 or more per year for the purposes of land tax; it was not necessary for the freeholder to occupy his land, nor even in later years to be resident in the county at all. At the time of the Great Reform Act in 1832, Breconshire had a population of approximately 47,800, but the rarity of contested elections makes it difficult to make a reliable estimate of the number qualified to vote; the greatest number ever recorded as voting before the Reform Act was 1,641 at the general election of 1818.

For centuries before 1832, Breconshire politics was dominated by the Morgan family of Tredegar, who were usually able to nominate the county's MP without opposition (as was also the case in Brecon borough). The changes introduced by the Reform Act did little to shake this hold, and a Morgan was still sitting unopposed in the 1860s. The Reform Act extended the county franchise slightly, allowing tenants-at-will, copyholders and leaseholders to vote, but Breconshire's electorate was still only 1,668 at the first post-Reform election, though it grew in the subsequent half-century.

Breconshire was always an almost entirely rural constituency, mountainous and offering poor resources for its agricultural population. The industrial revolution, however, brought coal-mining to the south of the county, and by the late 19th century this was much the most important economic activity and was probably the most important factor in its developing a political mind of its own. By the 1890s it had abandoned its loyalty to the (Conservative) Morgans, and like other industrial constituencies in Wales was a safe Liberal seat.

By the time of the 1911 census, the population of Breconshire was 63,036, and there were around 13,000 voters on the register around the outbreak of the First World War, a respectable size, but neighbouring Radnorshire with barely 6,000 voters was too small to survive. With effect from the 1918 general election, the two constituencies were merged, to form a new Brecon and Radnor constituency.

Members of Parliament

MPs 1542–1640

MPs 1640–1918

Elections

Elections in the 1830s

Elections in the 1840s

Elections in the 1850s

Bailey's death caused a by-election.

Elections in the 1860s

Elections in the 1870s 

Morgan succeeded to the peerage, becoming Lord Tredegar.

Elections in the 1880s

Elections in the 1890s

Elections in the 1900s

Elections in the 1910s

References

Notes
 D Brunton & D H Pennington, Members of the Long Parliament (London: George Allen & Unwin, 1954)
Cobbett's Parliamentary history of England, from the Norman Conquest in 1066 to the year 1803 (London: Thomas Hansard, 1808) 
 The Constitutional Year Book for 1913 (London: National Union of Conservative and Unionist Associations, 1913)
 F W S Craig, British Parliamentary Election Results 1832-1885 (2nd edition, Aldershot: Parliamentary Research Services, 1989)
 Henry Pelling, Social Geography of British Elections 1885-1910 (London: Macmillan, 1967)
 J Holladay Philbin, Parliamentary Representation 1832 - England and Wales (New Haven: Yale University Press, 1965)
 

Brecknockshire
Historic parliamentary constituencies in Mid Wales
Constituencies of the Parliament of the United Kingdom established in 1542
Constituencies of the Parliament of the United Kingdom disestablished in 1918